Magoebaskloof (Makgoba) Pass is situated in the Limpopo Province, on the R71, the road between Tzaneen and Polokwane, in South Africa.

It is a lush green mountainous area, covered by natural evergreen subtropical forest. This is an area where the small kingdom of Makgoba lived before they were conquered by Afrikaners who occupied Tzaneen area prior to 1905.

Today Magoebaskloof is a tourist attraction area which shows off its natural wonders such as the Debengeni (Dibekeni) waterfalls, Magoebaskloofdam and many forest hiking trails.

Mountain passes of Limpopo